is the debut album by Japanese pop singer Iku. It was released on March 25, 2009 under the Geneon and Universal labels. The album contains tracks from all three of her previously released singles.

The album was released in a regular CD-only edition (GNCL-1199) as well as a CD+DVD (GNCL-1198) limited edition.

Track listing 
 Spring up – 1:22
 Composer/arrangement： Maiko Iuchi
  – 4:44
 Lyrics/composer： Iku, Arrangement： Kazuya Takase
 (Ending theme from TV Tokyo anime series Hayate no Gotoku!)
  – 4:54
 Lyrics: Iku, Composer/arrangement： Bassy
  – 6:14
 Lyrics: Iku, Composer/arrangement： Satoshi Yaginuma
  – 5:29
 Lyrics： Iku, Composer/arrangement：Kazuya Takase
 (Nippon Television Series Purin Su theme song)
  Under the Bed – 4:27
 Lyrics/composer： Rubina, Arrangement： Zentaro Watanabe
  The Winds of Change – 5:48
 Lyrics: Iku, Composer/arrangement： Hiroyuki Oshima
  – 3:59
 Lyrics： Iku, Composer： Iku, Kazuya Takase/Arrangement： Kazuya Takase
 (Ending theme from TV Kanagawa anime series Toaru Majutsu no Index)
  – 5:35
 Lyrics: Hiiro Misaki, Composer： Nao, Arrangement： Zentaro Watanabe
  – 4:57
 Lyrics/composer： Iku, Arrangement： Kazuya Takase
  Fine – 5:09
 Lyrics: Iku, Composer/Arrangement： Shigetoshi Yamada
  – 4:23
 Lyrics/composer： Iku, Arrangement： Kazuya Takase
 (Ending theme from TV Kanagawa anime series Toaru Majutsu no Index)
  – 4:47
 Lyrics: Hiiro Misaki, Composer： Yoshiaki Dewa, Arrangement： Ryuuji Yamamoto

References

External links
 Official Iku website 
 Official Geneon website 

2009 albums